Carl Nilsson may refer to:

 Carl Nilsson (runner)
 Carl Nilsson (wrestler)

See also
 Carl Nielsen (disambiguation)